Rishta.com is an Indian television series which broadcast on Sony Entertainment Television on 3 January 2010. The show is produced by  Aditya Chopra under YRF Television. The show was conceived, written and directed by Rishab Seth.

Premise 
Rishta.com follows business partners, Isha Mirchandani and Rohan Mehra who run a matrimonial agency together. The two are polar opposites and have been frenemies since college. While Rohan is the typical Casanova, aloof, detached and sarcastic, Isha leans towards the more emotional, dedicated and systematic end of the spectrum. Huzaifa Ali, is the CEO of Rishta.com and is perpetually emerging with schemes to cut down costs, much to the chagrin of other employees. The second supporting character, Ruchika is the flamboyant, flirty and fashionable marketing and PR head. Other recurring characters include Isha's laid-back father who shares a close relationship with her. His girlfriend, Naina is 20 years his junior and is also a recurring character.

Cast

Main
Shruti Seth as Isha Mirchandani
Kavi Shastri as Rohan Mehra
Kavin Dave as Huzaifa Ali
 Kiren Jogi as Ruchika

Recurring
Siddhant Karnick as Gaurav Kapoor
Aishwarya Sakhuja as Sukhrit Singh
Seema Azmi as Sally
Hasan Zaidi as Ashish
Viraf Patel as Arjun Khanna
Shiv Panditt as Neeraj 
Kuki Grewal as Ramika Rathore 
Jugal Hansraj as Akshay Dwiwedi
Farida Jalal as Ruchika's Mother

References

External links

Sony Entertainment Television original programming
2010 Indian television series debuts
2010 Indian television series endings
Television shows set in Mumbai
Workplace television series
Indian LGBT-related television shows
Wedding television shows